HNLMS Jan van Brakel (F825) was a frigate of the  in service with the Royal Netherlands Navy from 1983 to 2001. She was renamed HS Kanaris (F464) (Greek: Φ/Γ Κανάρης) on transfer to the Hellenic Navy in 2002.

General characteristics 
The 'Standard' design would have anti-submarine (the ) and anti-aircraft (the ) variants with different armaments on a common hull design. The first eight Kortenaers were ordered in 1974, with four more ordered in 1976, although two were sold to Greece while being built, and replaced to two of the anti-aircraft variant.

Displacement was  standard and  full load. The ship was powered by two  Rolls-Royce Olympus TM 3B and two  Rolls-Royce Tyne TM 1C gas turbines in a combined gas or gas (COGOG) arrangement, driving two propeller shafts.

Dutch service history 
HNLMS Jan van Brakel was built at the KM de Schelde in Vlissingen. She was named after Jan van Brakel, a Dutch naval commander from the seventeenth century. The keel laying took place on 16 November 1979 and the launching on 16 May 1981. The ship was put into service on 14 April 1983.

From March until October 1993 she was deployed in the Adriatic Sea, supporting NATO and UN operations in Yugoslavia.

On 12 October 2001 she was decommissioned and sold to the Hellenic Navy.

Greek service history 
The ship was commissioned into the Hellenic Navy on 29 November 2002 and renamed HS Kanaris (Greek: Φ/Γ Κανάρης) after Konstantinos Kanaris, a hero of the Greek War of Independence and later Prime Minister of Greece. She was assigned the radio call sign "SZDT".

See also 
 List of active Hellenic Navy ships
 Konstantinos Kanaris
 Elli-class frigate
 Royal Netherlands Navy
 Hellenic Navy

Notes

References

External links 

 Official website of the Hellenic Navy: HS Kanaris (F464)

Kortenaer-class frigates
Ships built in Vlissingen
1981 ships
Frigates of the Cold War